Snowbound is a 1962 studio album by Sarah Vaughan, arranged by Don Costa.

Reception

The Allmusic review by John Bush awarded the album four stars and said that "Despite the peaceful atmosphere and strolling tempo, Vaughan hardly treats the material as a cinch for her voice; all of these eleven songs find her searching for different ways to present timeworn standards...Snowbound is an overlooked gem from Sarah Vaughan's Roulette years".

Track listing
 "Snowbound" (Russell Faith, Clarence Kehner) - 3:07
 "I Hadn't Anyone Till You" (Ray Noble) - 3:21
 "What's Good About Goodbye?" (Harold Arlen, Leo Robin) - 3:02
 "Stella by Starlight" (Ned Washington, Victor Young) - 2:55
 "Look to Your Heart" (Sammy Cahn, Jimmy Van Heusen) - 3:40
 "Oh, You Crazy Moon" (Johnny Burke, Van Heusen) - 3:43
 "Blah Blah Blah" (George Gershwin, Ira Gershwin) - 2:40
 "I Remember You" (Johnny Mercer, Victor Schertzinger) - 4:46
 "I Fall in Love Too Easily" (Cahn, Jule Styne) - 3:20
 "Glad to Be Unhappy" (Lorenz Hart, Richard Rodgers) - 4:11
 "Spring Can Really Hang You Up the Most" (Fran Landesman, Tommy Wolf) - 3:45

Personnel
Sarah Vaughan - vocals
Don Costa - arranger, conductor

References

Roulette Records albums
Albums conducted by Don Costa
Albums arranged by Don Costa
Albums produced by Teddy Reig
Sarah Vaughan albums
1963 albums